College Lake is a 65 hectare nature reserve in a former chalk quarry in Pitstone in the Aylesbury Vale district of Buckinghamshire. It is one of the flagship reserves of the Berkshire, Buckinghamshire and Oxfordshire Wildlife Trust, and it has an information centre, education facilities, a café, toilets and a shop. It is in the Chilterns Area of Outstanding Natural Beauty. The area east of the lake is a geological Site of Special Scientific Interest called Pitstone Quarry.

The site has more than a thousand species of wildlife on the lake, marshland and grassland. Rare species include Lapwings, which nest on islands in the lake, and redwing. The marshes are an important habitat for breeding waders. The grassland has a variety of flowers, which support a variety of insects, birds and mammals.

There is access from Upper Icknield Way.

References

External links
College Lake Environmental Education Centre, Berkshire, Buckinghamshire and Oxfordshire Wildlife Trust
College Lake Walks, Buckinghamshire County Council

Berkshire, Buckinghamshire and Oxfordshire Wildlife Trust
Pitstone